An Act extinguishing the authority of the bishop of Rome (28 Hen.8 c. 10) was an Act of Parliament passed by the Parliament of England in 1536. It consisted mostly of a violent attack on the authority of the Pope and his followers, and declared that those who committed the following offences would be liable for prosecution under the Statute of Praemunire 1392:

If any person or persons...shall, by writing, ciphering, printing, preaching or teaching, deed or act, obstinately or maliciously hold or stand with to extol, set forth, maintain or defend the authority, jurisdiction or power of the bishop of Rome or of his see, heretofore used, claimed or usurped within this realm... or by any pretence obstinately or maliciously invent anything for the extolling, advancement, setting forth, maintenance or defence of the same or any part thereof, or by any pretence obstinately or maliciously attribute any manner of jurisdiction, authority or preeminence to the said see of Rome, or to any bishop of the same see for the time being, within this realm... that then every such person or persons so doing or offending... being thereof lawfully convicted according to the laws of this realm, for every such default and offence shall incur and run into the dangers, penalties, pains and forfeitures ordained and provided by the statute of provision and praemunire made in the sixteenth year of the reign of the noble and valiant prince King Richard II against such as attempt, procure or make provision to the see of Rome or elsewhere for any thing or things to the derogation, or contrary to the prerogative royal or jurisdiction, of the Crown and dignity of this realm.

The Act also required all religious and secular officers, those taking Holy Orders, and those starting a degree at university to take an oath renouncing the jurisdiction of Rome and acknowledging Royal Supremacy. Refusing to take the oath was high treason (until 1547).

The Act was repealed in 1554 by 1&2 Ph. & M. c.8.

References

G. R. Elton, The Tudor Constitution: Second Edition (Cambridge University Press, 1982).
The Statutes of the Realm: Volume III (London: Record Commission, 1817), pp. 663–6.

English Reformation
Acts of the Parliament of England concerning religion
1536 in law
1536 in England
Christianity and law in the 16th century
1536 in Christianity